This is a list of notable people who were born in, or who have lived in, Big Bear Lake, California.

Mel Blanc – voice of Bugs Bunny
Noel Blanc – voice actor
Ryan Hall – long distance Olympic runner
Ralph Hodges – child actor
Shirley Jones – actor
Taran Killam – actor from Saturday Night Live, Wild 'n Out, MADtv
Brenda Martinez – track and field athlete
Ed Masuga – singer, musician, and songwriter
Richard Moll – actor from Night Court
Kevin Costner
Richard Karn – actor from Home Improvement (TV series)
Jordan Romero – mountain climber who climbed all 7 summits by the age of 15
Demetri Terzopoulos
Richard Rush (director)

See also
 Big Bear City, California, an unincorporated town east of Big Bear Lake
 Big Bear Lake, California, for the incorporated city

References

Big Bear Valley
Big Bear Lake
Big Bear Lake, California